Josefina Ludmer (San Francisco, Córdoba – May 3, 1939; Buenos Aires, December 10, 2016) was an Argentinean professor, essayist, writer, and literary critic.
She was a professor at the University of Buenos Aires (1984–1991) and later at Yale University (1988–2005), specializing in Latin American literature.

References

1939 births
2016 deaths
Argentine literary critics
Argentine women critics
Women literary critics
National University of Rosario alumni
Academic staff of the University of Buenos Aires
Yale University faculty